Julio César Chávez Jr. vs. Sebastian Zbik was a Middleweight championship fight for the WBC Middleweight Championship. It has been the first time that the son of legendary boxing Champion Julio César Chávez, fought for a world title, Chávez went on to become the new WBC Middleweight Champion.

Build up
This was the fourth time in boxing's history that a father and son combination would both become World Champions. This was also the second combo for the country of Mexico, the first ones being Guty Espadas and Guty Espadas, Jr.

Main card
Middleweight Championship  Sebastian Zbik vs.  Julio César Chávez Jr.
Chávez defeated Zbik via majority decision (112-116, 114-115, 114-114).
Featherweight bout:  Miguel Angel Garcia vs.  Rafaël Guzmán
Garcia defeated Guzmán via knockout at 1:55 in the fourth round.

Preliminary card
Light Welterweight bout:  Oscar Andrade vs.  Kai Zama
Andrade defeated Zama via technical knockout at 2:15 in the first round.
Lightweight bout:  Jessie Román vs.  James Grant
Román defeated Grant via knockout at 1:00 in the second round.
Lightweight bout:  Alejandro Luna vs.  Pablo Cesar Garcia
Luna defeated Garcia via unanimous decision (40-36, 40-36, 40-36).
Light Middleweight bout:  Vanes Martirosyan vs.  Saúl Román
Martirosyan defeated Román via technical knockout at 2:58 in the seventh round.
Light Middleweight bout:  Dakota Stone vs.  Christy Martin
Stone defeated Martin via technical knockout at 1:09 in the sixth round.

Reported fight earnings
These are the payouts to some of the fighters. These are the California State Athletic Commission purses as per the California bout agreements. They don't include sponsor money or other common forms of revenue paid through other streams. In California, if a fighter is more than two pounds overweight he is automatically penalized 20 percent of his purse and the weigh-in is over.

Sebastian Zbik $292,500 vs. Julio César Chávez Jr. $600,000
Miguel Angel Garcia $110,000 vs. Rafaël Guzmán$20,000
Vanes Martirosyan $50,000 vs. Saúl Román$12,500
Christy Martin $12,500 vs. Dakota Stone$3,500

References

External links
Chávez, Jr. vs. Zbik Official Fight Card from BoxRec
HBO Sports

Boxing matches
2011 in boxing
Boxing in Los Angeles
June 2011 sports events in the United States